The Corporation was an English pop group that was active in the 1980s and formed by musicians previously in popular, hit making,  English bands of the 1960s. They released a single in 1988, a remake of The Showstoppers' old hit "Ain't Nothing But a House Party" on the Corporation Records label. They briefly named themselves The Travelling Wrinklies, which was a dig at the Anglo-American all-star group The Traveling Wilburys.

The group consisted of Tony Crane (of The Merseybeats), Clem Curtis (of The Foundations), Mike Pender (of The Searchers), Brian Poole (of The Tremeloes) and Reg Presley (of The Troggs).

Band members

Former members
 Tony Crane – lead guitar (1988)
 Clem Curtis – drums (1988)
 Mike Pender – rhythm guitar (1988)
 Brian Poole – bass (1988)
 Reg Presley – lead vocals (1988)

Discography 
7" single
 "Ain't Nothing But a House Party" / "Ain't Nothing But a House Party" (Instrumental) – Corporation Records – KORP 1 – 1988
12" single
 "Ain't Nothing But a House Party" (Extended Mix) / "Ain't Nothing But a House Party", "Ain't Nothing But a House Party" (Instrumental) – Corporation Records – 12 KORP 1 – 1988

References

External links 
Brian Poole

English pop music groups
British supergroups
Musical groups established in 1988
Musical groups disestablished in 1988
Pop music supergroups
Musical groups from London